Colic or cholic is a form of pain that starts and stops abruptly. It occurs due to muscular contractions of a hollow tube (small and large intestine, gall bladder, ureter, etc.) in an attempt to relieve an obstruction by forcing content out. It may be accompanied by sweating and vomiting. Types include:
Baby colic, a condition, usually in infants, characterized by incessant crying
Biliary colic, blockage by a gallstone of the common bile duct or cystic duct
Devon colic or painter's colic, a condition caused by lead poisoning
Horse colic, a potentially fatal condition experienced by horses, caused by intestinal displacement or blockage
Renal colic, a pain in the flank, characteristic of kidney stones

The term is from Greek κολικός kolikos, "relative to the colon".

References

External links 

Acute pain

da:Kolik
id:Mulas
fi:Koliikki